Niederkorn railway station is a railway station serving Niederkorn, in the commune of Differdange, in south-western Luxembourg.  It is operated by Chemins de Fer Luxembourgeois, the state-owned railway company.

The station is situated on Line 60, which connects Luxembourg City to the Red Lands of the south of the country.

External links
 Official CFL page on Niederkorn station
 Rail.lu page on Niederkorn station

Railway stations in Differdange
Railway stations on CFL Line 60